The Great Southern Railway was a railway company that operated from Beverley to Albany in Western Australia between 1886 and 1896.  In 1896 the Western Australian Government Railways took over the company, and kept the name for the route.

Land development 

The Great Southern Railway project was directly tied in with developments of lands related to agriculture.

Construction 
The first sods for the  gauge railway were turned on 20 October 1886. This occurred simultaneously at Beverley and Albany by Lady Broome and the Governor Sir Frederick Broome respectively. The official opening of the line was on 1 June 1889.

The construction of the railway was significant for the development of economic activity in the region and led to the establishment of grain and sheep grazing, along with the development of towns such as Katanning, Broomehill, Tambellup, Cranbrook, Mount Barker and Woodanilling.

There was some initial debate over where the railway line should be placed. In the end, the link was made from an existing line ending at Beverley because it was the cheapest option. This devastated residents of the town of Kojonup, who initially hoped the line would pass through their town and follow the Albany Highway.

Conversion to diesel 
Steam locomotives were withdrawn from mainline work in Western Australia in 1971the process of removing steam from the Great Southern line had serious economic effects upon the towns of Narrogin and Katanning where extensive barracks and services relative to steam operations were closed down after this date.

Present 
Currently the line is managed by Arc Infrastructure. The majority of movements are CBH grain trains out of the Albany and Wagin depots. Aurizon currently operates a woodchip train between Albany and Redmond.

See also

References 

 
 Quinlan, Howard & Newland, John R.  Australian Railway Routes 1854-2000  2000.

Notes

External links

  

Defunct railway companies of Australia
Great Southern (Western Australia)
Railway lines in Western Australia
Railway lines opened in 1889
Agricultural land development schemes
3 ft 6 in gauge railways in Australia